Eliaser Yentji Sunur (27 March 1963 – 17 July 2021) was an Indonesian politician.

Biography
He served as the Regent of Lembata from 2017 till his death in 2021. He had previously served in the same position from 2011 till 2016.

Sunur died from complications of COVID-19 at the age of 58 during the COVID-19 pandemic in Indonesia.

References

1963 births
2021 deaths
Deaths from the COVID-19 pandemic in Indonesia
Regents of places in Indonesia
People from East Nusa Tenggara